Sonic Bloom is a 2013 solar-powered sculpture by Dan Corson, installed in Seattle's Pacific Science Center, in the U.S. state of Washington. Bellamy Pailthorp wrote, "It looks a bit like something you might find in a book by Dr. Seuss: five huge sculpted sunflowers with striped green and orange stems."

References

External links

 Sonic Bloom at Dan Corson's official website
 Seattle City Light presents Sonic Bloom at the Pacific Science Center at Seattle City Light

2013 establishments in Washington (state)
2013 sculptures
Outdoor sculptures in Seattle
Plants in art
Seattle Center